The 3rd Women's Chess Olympiad, organized by the FIDE, took place in 1966 in Oberhausen, West Germany.

Results
A total of 14 two-woman teams entered the competition. It was played as a round-robin tournament.

{| class="wikitable"
! # !!Country !! Players !! Points !! MP
|-
| style="background:gold;"|1 ||  || Nona Gaprindashvili, Valentina Kozlovskaya, Tatiana Zatulovskaya || 22 || 
|-
| style="background:silver;"|2 ||  || Alexandra Nicolau, Elisabeta Polihroniade, Margareta Perevoznic ||20½ || 
|-
| style="background:#cc9966;"|3 || || Edith Keller-Herrmann, Waltraud Nowarra, Gabriele Just || 17 || 
|-
| 4 ||  || Milunka Lazarević, Verica Nedeljković, Katarina Jovanović-Blagojević || 16½ || 
|-
| 5 ||  || Corry Vreeken-Bouwman, Hendrika Timmer, Fenny Heemskerk || 16 || 
|-
| 6 ||  || Květa Eretová, Jana Malypetrová, Marta Poláková || 15 || 16
|-
| 7 ||  || Éva Karakas, Gyuláné Krizsán-Bilek, Zsuzsa Verőci || 15 || 16 
|-
| 8 ||  || Venka Asenova, Evelina Trojanska, Antonina Georgieva || 14 || 
|-
| 9 ||  || Anne Sunnucks, Rowena Mary Bruce, Dinah Dobson || 12 || 
|-
| 10 ||  || Gisela Kahn Gresser, Lisa Lane, Eva Aronson || 9½ ||
|-
| 11 ||  || Krystyna Hołuj-Radzikowska, Mirosława Litmanowicz, Danuta Samolewicz-Owczarek || 9 || 
|-
| 12 ||  || Friedl Rinder, Ottilie Stibaner, Irmgard Kärner || 6½ || 
|-
| 13 ||  || Ingrid Larsen, Antonina Enevoldsen || 5 || 
|-
| 14 ||  || Ingeborg Kattinger, Maria Ager, Alfreda Hausner || 4 ||
|}

Individual medals
 Board 1:  Nona Gaprindashvili 9 / 11 = 81.8%
 Board 2:  Elisabeta Polihroniade 7½ / 9 = 83.3%
 Reserve Board:  Tatiana Zatulovskaya 8½/ 9 = 94.4%

References

External links
3rd Women's Chess Olympiad: Oberhausen 1966 OlimpBase

Women's Chess Olympiads
Olympiad w3
Chess Olympiad w3
Olympiad w3
Chess Olympiad w3
October 1966 sports events in Europe
November 1966 sports events in Europe
Sport in Oberhausen